Godchaux is a surname. Notable people with the surname include:

Donna Jean Godchaux (born 1947), American singer
Davon Godchaux (born 1994), American football player
Frank Godchaux Sr. (1879–1965), American businessman
Frank Godchaux (1901–1978), American football and baseball player
Keith Godchaux (1948–1980), American musician
Leon Godchaux (1824–1899), American businessman
Patricia Godchaux, American politician

See also 
Godshall
Gottschalk
Gottschall